Johann Franz Schenk von Stauffenberg (1658–1740) was Prince-Bishop of Constance from 1704 to 1740 and Prince-Bishop of Augsburg from 1737 to 1740.

Early life
Johann Franz Schenk von Stauffenberg was born in Lautlingen on 18 February 1658 as the fourth son of Wolfgang Friedrich Schenk von Stauffenberg (1612-1676) and his wife, Anna Barbara von Wernau (1632-1681).

Biography
He was made a canon of Konstanz Cathedral in 1667. He studied in Dillingen an der Donau until 1675. His father died in 1676 and his mother at 1681, after which time his uncles Hans Georg von Wernau and Franz Wilhelm von Stain acted as his guardians. He became a canon of Augsburg Cathedral in 1682.

In 1694, he became coadjutor bishop of Constance. Upon the death of Marquard Rudolf von Rodt, Bishop of Constance, on 10 June 1704, he succeeded as Bishop of Constance.  He was ordained as a priest on 11 November 1704.  On 26 January 1705 Pope Clement XI confirmed his appointment and he was subsequently consecrated as a bishop by Vincenzo Bichi, Bishop of Frascati, on 26 April 1705.

Following a bout of mental illness on the part of Alexander Sigismund von der Pfalz-Neuburg, Prince-Bishop of Augsburg, on 11 June 1714, the cathedral chapter of Augsburg Cathedral elected Stauffenberg coadjutor bishop of Augsburg, and the appointment was confirmed by Pope Clement XI on 24 September 1714.  He succeeded as Prince-Bishop of Augsburg upon the death of Alexander Sigismund von der Pfalz-Neuburg on 24 January 1737.

He died in Meßkirch on 12 June 1740.

References

External links 

1658 births
1740 deaths
Roman Catholic bishops of Constance
Roman Catholic bishops of Augsburg
Prince-bishops in the Holy Roman Empire